Dimple Creek (Kimples Creek) is a tributary of the Tohickon Creek in Haycock Township, Bucks County, Pennsylvania in the United States. It is part of the Delaware River watershed.

Statistics
Dimple Creek's GNIS identification number is 1173286, its Pennsylvania Department of Conservation and Natural Resources identification number is 03174. Dimple Creek flows through Lake Towhee.

Course
Flowing south, it receives a tributary from the left bank, then flows into Lake Towhee a lake formed by a dam in the creek.

Geology
Appalachian Highlands Division
Piedmont Province
Gettysburg-Newark Lowland Section
Diabase
Dimple Creek lies in an intrusion of magma into the local Brunswick Formation in the Newark Lowland section or rock, part of the Piedmont Province of the Appalchian Highlands Division. About 200 million years ago, about the time of the Jurassic and the Triassic, the magma intruded an cooled to form diabase consisting of labradorite and augite, very highly resistant to erosion.

Crossings and Bridges

References

Rivers of Bucks County, Pennsylvania
Rivers of Pennsylvania
Tributaries of Tohickon Creek